is a virtual pet video game for the PlayStation 2. It is the sequel to Seaman on the Dreamcast. In this game, players act as the god of a miniature island, charged with the task of rearing Gabo, a 20-centimeter tall Peking Man, communicating through a custom microphone-equipped gamepad.

Gameplay
Seaman 2 plays much like the original Seaman, but instead of playing as an actual inhabitant, the player is much more of a god, with the ability to alter environments to give things to the island's inhabitants.

Reception
Seaman 2 was the top-selling game during the week of its release in Japan at 33,000 copies. The game sold a total of 61,878 copies in the region in 2007.

References

External links
 Seaman.TV - official Seaman website

2007 video games
God games
Japan-exclusive video games
Microphone-controlled computer games
PlayStation 2 games
PlayStation 2-only games
Sega video games
Video game sequels
Single-player video games
Video games developed in Japan